Michael Brennan (25 September 1912 – 29 June 1982) was an English film and television actor.

Born in London, Brennan was married to actress Mary Hignett. He appeared in such films as Tom Brown's Schooldays, Ivanhoe, Thunderball, Tom Jones, The Amorous Adventures of Moll Flanders and Doomwatch. On television, he made guest appearances on All Creatures Great and Small (which featured his wife) and Dixon of Dock Green.

Partial filmography

"Pimpernel" Smith (1941) - Camp Guard with Lantern (uncredited)
They Made Me a Fugitive (1947) - Jim
Captain Boycott (1947) - Jim O'Rourke (uncredited)
Brighton Rock (1947) - Crabbe (uncredited)
Blanche Fury (1948) - Farmer
Escape (1948) - Truck Driver (uncredited)
My Brother's Keeper (1948) - Police Constable at Roadblock (uncredited)
Noose (1948) - Ropey (uncredited)
Brass Monkey (1948) - Wilks
Cardboard Cavalier (1949) - Brother Barebones
For Them That Trespass (1949) - Det. Insp. Benstead
The Chiltern Hundreds (1949) - Sergeant
Morning Departure (1950) - C.P.O. Barlow
They Were Not Divided (1950) - Smoke O'Connor
Paul Temple's Triumph (1950) - (uncredited)
Waterfront (1950) - Engineer
Blackout (1950) - Mickey Garston
No Trace (1950) - Mike Fenton
The Clouded Yellow (1950) - Superintendent Ross
Circle of Danger (1951) - Bert Oakshott
The Lady with a Lamp (1951)
Tom Brown's Schooldays (1951) - Black Bart
Emergency Call (1952) - Police Constable
Ivanhoe (1952) - Baldwin
 13 East Street (1952) - George Mack
Something Money Can't Buy (1952) - Fairground boss
Made in Heaven (1952) - Sgt. Marne
Personal Affair (1953) - Police Officer (uncredited)
It's a Grand Life (1953) - Sgt. Maj. O'Reilly
Trouble in Store (1953) - Davis
Up to His Neck (1954) - CPO Brazier
See How They Run (1955) - Sgt. Maj. Towers
Up in the World (1956) - Prison Warder
Not Wanted on Voyage (1957) - Chief Steward
Just My Luck (1957) - Masseur
The Naked Truth (1957) - 2nd Irishman (uncredited)
A Tale of Two Cities (1958) - Tom - Coach Driver (uncredited)
Law and Disorder (1958) - Bent - Warder Ext. Prison
The Big Money (1958) - Bluey
The 39 Steps (1959) - Detective on Train (uncredited)
The Day They Robbed the Bank of England (1960) - Walters (uncredited)
Watch Your Stern (1960) - Security guard
Johnny Nobody (1961) - Supt. Lynch
On the Fiddle (1961) - Soldier at Army Meat Van (uncredited)
Ambush in Leopard Street (1962) - Harry
The Devil's Agent (1962) - Horvat
Live Now, Pay Later (1963) - Bailiff
The Girl Hunters (1963) - Policeman
Tom Jones (1963) - Jailer at Newgate (uncredited)
The Amorous Adventures of Moll Flanders (1965) - The Turnkey
Thunderball (1965) - Janni
Death Is a Woman (1966) - Bonelli
The Deadly Affair (1966) - Wolfe the Barman (uncredited)
Three Hats for Lisa (1966) - Police Sergeant
Just like a Woman (1967) - Commissionaire
Woman Times Seven (1967) - (segment "At The Opera")
Cuckoo Patrol (1967) - Superman No.1
The Great Pony Raid (1968) - Butch
Lust for a Vampire (1971) - Landlord
Fright (1971) - Sergeant
Doomwatch (1972) - Tom Straker
Up the Front (1972) - M.P.
Nothing But the Night (1972) - Deck Hand

References

External links

1912 births
1982 deaths
English male television actors
English male film actors
20th-century English male actors
Male actors from London